BET Presents: Love And Happiness: An Obama Celebration was held at the White House on the South Lawn on October 26, 2016. It aired November 15, 2016 on BET and Centric. The celebration served as a "love letter to President Obama and First Lady, Michelle Obama." The event was hosted by Terrence J and Regina Hall. Featuring musical guest, Jill Scott, Common, Usher, Bell Biv DeVoe, The Roots, Janelle Monaé, De La Soul, Yolanda Adams, Michelle Williams, Kierra Sheard and Leslie Odom Jr.

Hosts
Terrence J
Regina Hall

The Final Goodbye
During the final concert of the evening, Barack Obama wanted to thank BET for agreeing the film, his block party.

Speakers
Jessie Williams
Samuel L. Jackson
Bradley Cooper
Angela Bassett

Set lists

References

Concerts in the United States
2016 in American music
2016 in Washington, D.C.
BET original programming